Ellis Larkins (May 15, 1923 – September 30, 2002) was an American jazz pianist born in Baltimore, Maryland, known for his two recordings with Ella Fitzgerald: the albums Ella Sings Gershwin (1950) and Songs in a Mellow Mood (1954). He was also the pianist on the first solo sides by singer Chris Connor on her album Chris (1954).

Larkins was the first African American to attend the Peabody Conservatory of Music, an institute in Baltimore. He began his professional playing career in New York City after moving there to attend the Juilliard School. While still at Juilliard, Larkins performed jazz piano with guitarist Billy Moore at Café Society Uptown and over the next ten years in his own groups, or in support of, clarinetist Edmond Hall and singers Helen Humes and Mildred Bailey. He recorded with Coleman Hawkins, and Dicky Wells in the 1940s. In the 1950s, he recorded with Ella Fitzgerald, Ruby Braff, and Beverly Kenney. His 1960s work included recordings or performances with Eartha Kitt, Joe Williams, Georgia Gibbs and Harry Belafonte.

Though he was best known as an accompanist, Larkins recorded several solo albums in the 1950s. In the 1970s, he performed regularly at several New York venues, including Gregory's, a small bar on the Upper East Side.

Discography

As leader

As sideman
With Ruby Braff
 Ellis Larkins & Ruby Braff: Duets Volume 1, (Vanguard, 1955 [1991])
 Ellis Larkins & Ruby Braff: Duets Volume 2, (Vanguard, 1955 [2000])
 Ruby Braff and Ellis Larkins: 2 Part Inventions in Jazz, (Vanguard, 10-inch LP, 1955) – reissued as Ruby Braff/Ellis Larkins: Pocket Full of Dreams, (Vanguard, 1957) & on the Duets CDs
 Ruby Braff and Ellis Larkins: The Grand Reunion, (Chiaroscuro, 1972) – CD reissue, 1999
 Ruby Braff and Ellis Larkins: Calling Berlin, Vol. 1 (Arbors, 1994 [1995])
 Ruby Braff and Ellis Larkins: Calling Berlin, Vol. 2 (Arbors, 1994 [1996])
With Anita Kert Ellis
 A Legend Sings (Red Onion, 1979)
With Ella Fitzgerald
 Ella Sings Gershwin (Decca, 1950)
 Songs in a Mellow Mood (Decca, 1954)
 "You Turned the Tables on Me", "Nice Work If You Can Get It", "I've Got a Crush on You" on Newport Jazz Festival: Live at Carnegie Hall (Pablo, 1973)
With Sonny Stitt
 What's New!!! (Roulette, 1966)
 I Keep Comin' Back! (Roulette, 1966)
With Joe Williams
 That Holiday Feelin (Verve, 1990)

References

External links
 Ellis Larkins recordings at the Discography of American Historical Recordings.
 Profile of Ellis Larkins by Whitney Balliett for the New Yorker

1923 births
2002 deaths
American jazz pianists
American male pianists
RCA Victor artists
Musicians from Baltimore
Peabody Institute alumni
20th-century American pianists
Jazz musicians from Maryland
20th-century American male musicians
American male jazz musicians
Black Lion Records artists
Black & Blue Records artists